Channing Godfrey Peoples is an American writer, director, and producer. Her feature film directorial debut Miss Juneteenth received critical acclaim.

Early life and education 
Peoples was raised on the south side of Fort Worth in what she referred to as "Black Texas". Her family regularly attended Black theatre performances, which influenced Peoples to read classic Black literature by writers such as Toni Morrison and Gloria Naylor.

She received her bachelor's degree in theater from Baylor University and her master of fine arts degree from University of Southern California.

Career

Miss Juneteenth 
Peoples began writing Miss Juneteenth in 2013, shortly after completing film school. She was inspired to write the film because she grew up attending Juneteenth celebrations and Miss Juneteenth pageants and the holiday holds great significance for her. She attended the Sundance Creative Producing Summit and other writing workshops to continue to develop the screenplay. When the film was in pre-production, Peoples was named one of Filmmaker Magazine's 25 New Faces of Independent Film 2018. Miss Juneteenth, also Peoples' directorial debut, premiered at Sundance 2020 and was released VOD on Juneteenth of that year. The film received critical acclaim and holds a 99% rating on Rotten Tomatoes.

She cites Julie Dash, Jonathan Demme, and her mentor Charles Burnett as influences.

Other work 
Peoples wrote two episodes of the third season of Queen Sugar.

In January 2021 it was announced that Peoples signed a first look deal with Universal Content Productions. Her first scheduled project is to create a television adaptation of Miss Juneteenth.

Peoples' wrote and directed the short film Doretha's Blues, which debuted at SXSW in 2021. The movie stars Tonea Stewart and follows "a former musician whose son was killed by police and who can no longer find it in her to sing." She was inspired to write Doretha's Blues in the aftermath of Michael Brown's death, as she was interested in the lives of the family left behind. Like Miss Juneteenth, the film is set in Fort Worth, Texas.

Personal life 
Peoples is married to producer Neil Creque Williams, whom she met in her graduate program at USC. They have one daughter (b. 2018).

Filmography

Film

Awards and nominations

References

External links 
 Official Instagram

Year of birth missing (living people)
Living people
African-American film directors
American women film producers
African-American screenwriters
African-American women writers
American women film directors
Filmmakers from Texas
People from Fort Worth, Texas
Baylor University alumni
USC School of Cinematic Arts alumni
21st-century African-American people
21st-century African-American women